Robert S. Travis (May 2, 1909 – August 14, 1980) was a member of the Wisconsin State Assembly and the Wisconsin State Senate.

Travis was born in Platteville, Wisconsin. During World War II, he served in the United States Army crewing a radar truck in the European theater. Travis went to Michigan State University; he was the manager of Irvington Dairy Products on Omaha, Nebraska and was an insurance agent. His son Robert S. Travis, Jr. also served in the Wisconsin Assembly. He died on August 14, 1980, in Platteville, Wisconsin.

Political career
Travis was elected to the Assembly in 1948. He was elected to the Senate in 1954 and re-elected in 1958. Travis was also a delegate to the 1960 Republican National Convention.

References

People from Platteville, Wisconsin
Wisconsin state senators
Members of the Wisconsin State Assembly
Military personnel from Wisconsin
United States Army soldiers
United States Army personnel of World War II
Businesspeople from Wisconsin
Michigan State University alumni
1909 births
1980 deaths
20th-century American businesspeople
20th-century American politicians